Saint Paulinus was an early Christian, who, along with a priest, deacon and soldier—all of whose names were forgotten through time—suffered martyrdom in 67. Paulinus is believed to have been converted and sent by St. Peter, whom he met at Antioch, to Lucca. He is believed to be the first Bishop of Lucca.

Notes

67 deaths
Saints from Roman Italy
1st-century Christian martyrs
Year of birth unknown